WTAX-FM (93.9 MHz) is a commercial radio station broadcasting a News/Talk radio format, simulcast with WTAX 1240 AM. Licensed to Sherman, Illinois, it serves the Springfield metropolitan area. The station is owned by Saga Communications of Illinois, LLC.  The radio studios and offices are on East Sangamon Avenue in Springfield.

WTAX-FM has an effective radiated power (ERP) of 15,000 watts.  The transmitter is on 450th Avenue at Interstate 55 in Mount Fulcher, Illinois.

Programming
Weekdays on WTAX-AM-FM begin with a local drive time show, "The Morning Newswatch," hosted by Joey McLaughlin.  The rest of the weekday schedule is made up of nationally syndicated talk shows:  Hugh Hewitt, "Markley, Van Camp and Robbins," Sean Hannity, Mark Levin, John Batchelor, "Red Eye Radio" and "This Morning, America's First News with Gordon Deal."

Weekends feature shows on money, health, home repair, technology, the law and cars.  Weekend hosts include Joe Pags, Sebastian Gorka, Chris Plante, Leo Laporte and Bill Handel.  Most hours begin with world and national news from CBS Radio News.

History
The station changed its call sign to WLRX on May 3, 1981. On June 1, 1986, the call sign was changed to WESZ. On November 15, 1994, it was changed to WWTE, and on September 16, 1996, to WYXY. From February 19, 2001, to April 7, 2005, the station aired a hot adult contemporary format as WMHX, "Mix 93.9". On April 8, 2005, the station flipped to adult hits as "93.9 ABE FM" and adopted the callsign WABZ.

On October 2, 2013, the WQQL call sign was moved from 101.9 to 93.9, and the format was changed to classic hits as "Cool 93.9". On the same day, "ABE FM" was moved to FM translator 101.1 W266BZ (which is currently also aired on WDBR's HD2 subchannel as classic country "101.1 The Outlaw").

On May 28, 2021, WQQL announced that the classic hits format would move to translator 93.5 W288DL on June 7; at that time, WQQL assumed the translator's previous format, a simulcast of AM station WTAX. The move would end the use of the "Cool" branding in Springfield, as the station would rebrand as "Rewind 93.5" with the move; the name had been used, originally on 101.9, since 1993. The move is also believed to be an answer to a previous move with WMAY, having a simulcast on WMAY-FM added the previous September, giving WTAX a similar option on FM radio. Concurrent with the move, 93.9 changed its call letters to WTAX-FM to match its new simulcast partner.

Previous logo

References

External links

TAX-FM
Radio stations established in 1971
1971 establishments in Illinois
News and talk radio stations in the United States